K114 or K-114 may refer to:

K-114 (Kansas highway), a state highway in Kansas
Russian submarine Tula (K-114)
HMS Bellwort (K114), a former UK Royal Navy ship
9K114 Shturm, a Russian anti-tank missile system
Symphony No. 14 (Mozart) in A major, by Mozart